Almost Married is a 1932 American pre-Code thriller film directed by William Cameron Menzies and written by Guy Bolton, Alexander Kirkland and Wallace Smith. The film stars Violet Heming, Ralph Bellamy, Alexander Kirkland and Alan Dinehart.

The film is adapted from the 1931 novel The Devil's Triangle by the British writer Andrew Soutar. It was made by Fox Film, the forerunner of 20th Century Fox. The film's art director was Gordon Wiles while the costumes were designed by Dolly Tree.

Plot
A Russian woman with a forged passport attempts to elude the police and seeks the assistance of a man she met one summer in Scotland. She married an official at the British Embassy in Moscow, and settles down with him in England. However she reveals that she is already married, and her husband is criminally insane.

Cast        
Violet Heming as Anita Mellikovna
Ralph Bellamy as Deene Maxwell
Alexander Kirkland as Louis Capristi / Charles Pringle
Alan Dinehart as Inspector Slante
 Mary Gordon as Cook  
 Maria Alba as Mariette  
 Mischa Auer as Russian Policeman  
 Herbert Bunston as Lord Laverling  
 Eva Dennison as Lady Laverling  
 Grayce Hampton as Aunt Mathilda  
 Herbert Mundin as Jenkins, the butler  
 Tempe Pigott 
 Gustav von Seyffertitz

References

External links 
 
 

1932 films
Fox Film films
American thriller films
1930s thriller films
Films directed by William Cameron Menzies
American black-and-white films
Films set in England
Films set in Russia
Films based on British novels
1930s English-language films
1930s American films